Senjed may refer to:
 Elaeagnus angustifolia, a plant
 Senjed, North Khorasan
 Senjed, Yazd